The 1989 Southwest Texas State Bobcats football team was an American football team that represented Southwest Texas State University (now known as Texas State University) during the 1989 NCAA Division I-AA football season as a member of the Southland Conference (SLC). In their seventh year under head coach John O'Hara, the team compiled an overall record of 5–6 with a mark of 3–3 in conference play.

Schedule

References

Southwest Texas State
Texas State Bobcats football seasons
Southwest Texas State Bobcats football